Lewis Travis (born 16 October 1997) is an English professional footballer who plays for Blackburn Rovers.

Youth Career 
Having come through the ranks at Liverpool as a defender, Travis was released and soon joined the local outfit of Blackburn Rovers where Tony Mowbray transitioned the Merseyside born player into a midfielder. Lewis Travis earned a professional contract at aged 19.

Club career

In January 2017, Travis signed a new professional contract at Blackburn Rovers penning a one-year deal.

In August 2017, Travis made his first team debut, starting the match for Blackburn Rovers in the 2017–18 EFL Trophy game against Stoke City U21s. In December 2018, Travis broke into the starting eleven for Blackburn Rovers and had an extended run of games in the centre of midfield in which he impressed both supporters and the manager, Tony Mowbray, who said he had saved him money because he would not have to make a new signing in his position.

In September 2021 Lewis Travis captained his side as Darragh Lenihan missed out through injury. Blackburn Rovers fell short at the John Smith's Stadium as Huddersfield Town came away as 3-2 winners. 

In March 2022, Lewis Travis signed a long term deal with Blackburn Rovers keeping him at the club until 2026.  In July 2022, he was appointed club captain following the departure of Darragh Lenihan.

Career statistics

References

External links
 

1997 births
Living people
English footballers
Association football defenders
Blackburn Rovers F.C. players
English Football League players